This article lists:
 International Grandmasters for chess composition, for both chess problems and studies
 International Honorary Masters for chess composition
 International Solving Grandmasters
Such awards were formerly managed by FIDE through its section for chess composition, the Permanent Commission for Chess Composition, and now awarded by the World Federation for Chess Composition, an independent body that co-operates with FIDE.

International Grandmasters for chess compositions
Note: deceased Grandmasters are indicated with (†) – Nationality is that of the year when the title was awarded.

{|class="sortable wikitable"
!Year !!Name !! Country 
|-
| 1972 || (†) ||  
|-
| 1972 || (†)|| 
|-
| 1972 || (†) || 
|-
| 1972 || (†) ||  
|- 
| 1976 || (†) || 
|-
| 1976 || (†) ||  
|-
| 1976 || (†) || 
|-
| 1976 || (†) || 
|-
| 1976 || (†) ||  
|-
| 1976 || (†) || 
|-
| 1980 ||||  
|-
| 1980 || (†) || 
|-
| 1980 || (†) ||  
|-
| 1980 || (†) ||  
|-
| 1980 || (†)||     
|-
| 1984  ||  ||  
|-
| 1984  || (†) ||    
|-
| 1984  || ||  
|-
| 1984  || ||    
|-
| 1984 || ||  
|-
| 1988 || (†) ||  
|- 
| 1988 || (†)   || 
|- 
| 1988 || (†) ||  
|- 
| 1988 || ||  
|- 
| 1988 || (†) || 
|- 
| 1989 || (†)||    
|- 
| 1989 || || 
|- 
| 1989 || ||    
|- 
| 1990 || ||  
|- 
| 1990 || (†) || 
|- 
| 1992 || || 
|- 
| 1992 || || 
|-
| 1993 || (†) ||  
|- 
| 1993 || ||  
|-
| 1993 || (†) ||  
|-
| 1993 || (†) ||  
|-
| 1993 || (†) ||  
|-
| 1995 || || 
|-
| 1995 || ||  
|-
| 1996 || (†) || 
|-
| 1996 || ||  
|-
| 2001 || || 
|-
| 2004 || ||  
|-
| 2004 || ||
|-
| 2004 || || 
|-
| 2004 || || 
|-
| 2005 || || 
|-
| 2005 || || 
|-
| 2005 || || 
|-
| 2005 || || 
|-
| 2007 || || 
|-
| 2007 || ||  
|-
| 2007 || ||  
|-
| 2007 || ||  
|-
| 2007 || || 
|-
| 2007 || || 
|-
| 2007 || ||
|-
| 2009 || (†) ||  
|-
| 2009 || ||   
|-
| 2010 || || 
|-
| 2010 || || 
|-
| 2010 || || 
|-
| 2010 || || 
|-
| 2010 || (†) || 
|-
| 2010 || || 
|-
| 2010 || (†) || 
|-
| 2010 || || 
|-
| 2012 || (†)|| 
|-
| 2012 || || 
|-
| 2012 || || 
|-
| 2012 || || 
|-
| 2012 || (†) || 
|-
| 2012 || || 
|-
| 2012 || (†)  || 
|-
| 2012 || || 
|-
| 2012 || || 
|-
| 2013 |||| 
|-
| 2013 |||| 
|-
| 2015 |||| 
|-
| 2015 |||| 
|-
| 2015 || || 
|-
| 2015 |||| 
|- 
| 2017 |||| 
|}

International Honorary Masters for chess composition
{|class="sortable wikitable"
!Year !!Name !! Country 
|-
| 1986 || (†)||
|-
| 1986 ||  (†) || 
|-
| 1986 ||  (†) || 
|-
| 1987 || (†) || 
|-
| 1987 || (†) || 
|-
| 1988 || (†) || 
|-
| 1988 || (†) || 
|-
| 1988 || (†) || 
|-
| 1989 || (†) || 
|-
| 1991 || (†) || 
|-
| 1991 || (†) || 
|-
| 1992 || (†) || 
|-
| 1994 || (†) ||
|-
| 1998 || (†)||
|-
| 1999 || (†) ||
|-
| 1999 ||  (†)||
|-
| 2000 ||  (†)||
|-
| 2006 || (†)||
|-
| 2007 || (†) ||
|-
| 2007 || ||
|-
| 2012 || (†)||
|-
| 2015 || ||
|}

International Solving Grandmasters
{|class="sortable wikitable"
!Year !!Name !! Country 
|-
| 1982 |||| 
|-
| 1984 |||| 
|-
| 1984 || (†)|| 
|-
| 1985 |||| 
|-
| 1988 |||| 
|-
| 1988 |||| 
|-
| 1988 |||| 
|-
| 1991 |||| 
|-
| 1993 ||   || 
|-
| 1997 |||| 
|-
| 1997 ||||  
|-
| 1998 |||| 
|-
| 1999 |||| 
|-
| 2000 |||| 
|-
| 2001 |||| 
|-
| 2002 |||| 
|-
| 2002 |||| 
|-
| 2002 |||| 
|-
| 2004 ||||   
|-
| 2004 |||| 
|-
| 2007 |||| 
|-
| 2008 |||| 
|-
| 2008 |||| 
|-
| 2008 |||| 
|-
| 2009 |||| 
|- 
| 2009 |||| 
|-
| 2010 |||| 
|- 
| 2011 |||| 
|-
| 2011 |||| 
|-
| 2014 |||| 
|-
| 2014 |||| 
|-
| 2015 |||| 
|-
| 2017 |||| 
|}

See also 
 List of chess grandmasters
 FIDE Album It explains the scoring required to become a master in composition.

References

External links 
 Titles

Chess-related lists